Chiropterotriton aureus, the Atzalan golden salamander, is a species of salamander in the family Plethodontidae. It is endemic to the Chiconquiaco region of the Sierra Madre Oriental of Veracruz, Mexico. It has been found in a heavily degraded cloud forest habitat with large numbers of arboreal bromeliads over oak trees.

References 

Chiropterotriton
Endemic amphibians of Mexico
Amphibians described in 2018
Fauna of the Sierra Madre Oriental